Peter Francis Mack Jr. (November 1, 1916 – July 4, 1986) was a U.S. Representative from Illinois.

Early life
Born in Carlinville, Illinois, Mack attended the public schools and Blackburn College in Carlinville and St. Louis (Missouri) University. Mack took special courses in aviation at Springfield Junior College and St. Louis University. He was engaged in the automotive sales and service business in Carlinville, Illinois. He was also a licensed commercial pilot. He enlisted in United States Navy in 1942 and served four years in naval air force and later served as a Naval Reserve officer with rank of commander. He was nicknamed Illinois's "Flying Congressman" after piloting the single-engine Beechcraft Bonanza "Friendship Flame" on a circumnavigational solo flight in 1951 on a good will tour. He visited 30 countries and 45 cities, logging 210 hours in the air.

Congressional career
Mack was elected as a Democrat to the Eighty-first and to the six succeeding Congresses (January 3, 1949 – January 3, 1963). He was an unsuccessful candidate for reelection in 1962 to the Eighty-eighth Congress, and an unsuccessful candidate for election in 1974 and in 1976 to the Ninety-fourth and Ninety-fifth Congresses.

While in Congress, Mack was a member of the House Commerce Committee and served as chairman of its Commerce and Finance Subcommittee.  In 1958, after a series of lurid magazine articles and Hollywood films denouncing the switchblade knife as an accessory of youth gang culture, Mack sponsored legislation to make automatic-opening or switchblade knives illegal to purchase, sell, or import in interstate commerce, which was enacted into law as the Switchblade Knife Act of 1958.   Mack and other congressmen supporting the legislation believed that by stopping the importation and interstate sales of automatic knives (effectively halting sales of new switchblades), the law would reduce youth gang violence by blocking access to what had become a symbolic weapon.  However, while switchblade imports and sales to lawful owners soon ended, later legislative research demonstrated that youth gang violence rates had in fact rapidly increased, as gang members turned to firearms instead of knives.

Later career
Mack served as assistant to the president of Southern Railway from 1963 to 1975, and owned and operated the Peter Mack Company, a real estate and investment firm. In 1976, Mack attempted a political comeback, unsuccesffuly challenging Findley. He was a resident of Potomac, Maryland, until his death in Rockville, Maryland on July 4, 1986. Mack was interred in Arlington National Cemetery.

Notes

References

"Peter Mack, 69, Dies; 'Flying Congressman,'" New York Times. July 7, 1986.

1916 births
1986 deaths
20th-century American politicians
Aviators from Illinois
Blackburn College (Illinois) alumni
Burials at Arlington National Cemetery
Circumnavigators of the globe
Commercial aviators
Democratic Party members of the United States House of Representatives from Illinois
Military personnel from Illinois
People from Carlinville, Illinois
People from Potomac, Maryland
Saint Louis University alumni
United States Navy officers
United States Navy pilots of World War II